Sergey Kravtsov may refer to:
Sergey Kravtsov (sailor) (born 1960), Belarusian Olympic sailor
Sergey Kravtsov (cyclist) (born 1948), Soviet Olympic cyclist
Sergey Kravtsov (politician) (born 1974), Russian politician, Minister of Education since 2020